The Comedy Get Down is an American comedy mockumentary television series, created by Tom Brunelle and Brad Wollack, that premiered on October 12, 2017, on BET. The series stars Cedric the Entertainer, Eddie Griffin, D. L. Hughley, George Lopez, and Charlie Murphy. This was Charlie Murphy’s last role in a television series before his death.

Premise
The Comedy Get Down is described by BET as the "first scripted comedy series about what really happens behind the scenes of a massive stand-up comedy tour featuring five legendary comics – George Lopez, DL Hughley, Cedric the Entertainer, Eddie Griffin and Charlie Murphy. They’re hilarious, insane and unapologetic on stage, but the second they step off is when the real show begins. The storylines are based on actual events that have taken place not only on their wildly successful Comedy Get Down arena tour, but throughout the 25 plus years each has been a nationally headlining comedian. A workplace comedy at its core, the 30 minute, single-camera series explores the personal and professional relationships of these five comic titans as they navigate the challenges of life on the road: seedy venues, racist road managers, pushy wives, angry baby mamas, obsessive fans, demanding celebrities, shady politicians and more."

Cast and characters

Main

 Cedric the Entertainer as himself
 Eddie Griffin as himself
 D. L. Hughley as himself
 George Lopez as himself
 Charlie Murphy as himself

Recurring

 Tawny Newsome as Nina
 Steve Berg as White Terry

Guest

 Ice Cube as himself
 Dale Godboldo as Mr. Randall
 Eric Dickerson as himself
 Aloma Wright as Aunt Caldonia
 Kareem Abdul-Jabbar as himself

Episodes

Production

Development
On April 20, 2016, it was announced that BET had given the production a series order for a first season consisting of ten episodes. Executive producers were set to include Tom Brunelle, Brad Wollack, Michael Rotenberg, Greg Walter, Kimberly Carver, and Eric C. Rhone. Production companies involved with the series were reported to include 3 Arts Entertainment and Free 90 Media.

Casting
Alongside the announcement of the series order, it was announced that main cast would include Cedric the Entertainer, Eddie Griffin, D. L. Hughley, George Lopez, and Charlie Murphy playing fictional versions of themselves. On August 8, 2016, it was announced that Tawny Newsome had been cast in a supporting role.

References

External links
 
 

2010s American black television series
2010s American mockumentary television series
2017 American television series debuts
2017 American television series endings
English-language television shows
BET original programming
Television series by 3 Arts Entertainment